Diabetes Victoria, formerly known as Diabetes Australia-Victoria is the leading charitable organisation and peak consumer body working to reduce the impact of diabetes based in Victoria, Australia. Founded in 1953, they support and campaign for Victorians who are affected by type 1 diabetes, Gestational diabetes, type 2 diabetes and prediabetes, as well as those at risk. They aim to reduce the effect of diabetes in Victoria, to assist with the procurement of diabetes medication, and to find a cure for diabetes. They are a member of Diabetes Australia.

Campaigns
Diabetes Victoria has had various campaigns to help reduce the cases of diabetes. As a member of the Obesity Policy Coalition, Diabetes Victoria lobbied against tax-payer funded surgeries for controlling weight, such as gastric bypass surgery, claiming that they do not address the root causes of diabetes
and for stricter control over the toys given away as part of kids' meals, in an effort to reduce childhood obesity.

They also promote healthier lifestyles by encouraging Victorians to walk more, as a form of exercise.

In addition to working to reduce the number of cases of diabetes, Diabetes Victoria has advocated for adequate treatment for those afflicted by the disease
and conducted research aimed at combating the practice of diabetics skipping insulin shots as a means of losing weight.

References

External links
 Official web site

Medical and health organisations based in Victoria (Australia)
Diabetes organizations